I Am an Island is the debut studio album from Scottish alternative rock band Fatherson and was released April 7, 2014. The album includes the singles "I Like Not Knowing" and "Mine for Me".

Singles 
 "I Like Not Knowing" was released as the album's lead single on March 26, 2014.
 "Mine for Me" was released as the album's second single on July 9, 2014.

Track listing

Release history

References

2014 debut albums
Fatherson albums